Fort Johnston may refer to:

 Fort Johnston (North Carolina) on National Register of Historic Places listings in North Carolina
 Fort Johnston (Leesburg, Virginia)
 Fort Johnston (Malawi)